Umiasussuk (old spelling: Umiasugssuk) is a  mountain in Avannaata municipality in northwestern Greenland, located in the northern part of Qaarsorsuaq Island in the Upernavik Archipelago. The name of the mountain means "a boat-shaped mountain" in the Greenlandic language.

Geography 

Via a small isthmus in the east, the mountain is connected with the remainder of the large Qaarsorsuaq Island. To the north, the Torsuut strait separates the mountain from Atilissuaq Island. To the west, the low Akia Island separates the mountain from Upernavik Island.

References 

Mountains of the Upernavik Archipelago